Chae Hom is a district (amphoe) of Lampang province, northern Thailand.

Geography

Neighboring districts are (from the north clockwise): Wang Nuea, Ngao, Mae Mo, Mueang Lampang and Mueang Pan of Lampang Province.

Administration
The district is divided into seven subdistricts (tambons), which are further subdivided into 58 villages (mubans). Chae Hom is a township (thesaban tambon) which covers parts of tambon Chae Hom. There are a further seven tambon administrative organizations (TAO).

References

External links
amphoe.com (Thai)

Chae Hom